The 2011 UEFA European Under-17 Championship was the tenth edition of UEFA's European Under-17 Football Championship. Serbia hosted the tournament between the 3 and 15 May. 6 Teams also qualified for the 2011 FIFA U-17 World Cup. Players born after 1 January 1994 were eligible to participate in this competition.

England was the defending champion, but lost in the semi-final. The Netherlands
defeated Germany 5–2 in the final to win the championship for the first time.

Qualification

The final tournament of the 2011 UEFA European Under-17 Championship was preceded by two qualification stages: a qualifying round and an Elite round. During these rounds, 52 national teams competed to determine the seven teams.

Participants

 
 
 
 
 
 
 
  (hosts)

Match officials 
A total of 6 referees, 8 assistant referees and 2 fourth officials were appointed for the final tournament.

Referees
 Sébastien Delferiere
 Liran Liany
 Steven McLean
 Artur Ribeiro
 Kristo Tohver
 Stavros Tritsonis

Assistant referees
 Raúl Cabañero
 Peter Chládek
 Ridiger Çokaj
 Zaven Hovhannisyan
 Ivo Kolev
 Giorgi Kruashvili
 Arunas Šeškus
 Vencel Tóth

Fourth officials
 Vlado Glodovic
 Boško Jovanetić

Group stage
All times are local (UTC+2).

Group A

Group B

Knockout stage

Knockout Map

All times are local (UTC+2).

Semifinals

Final

Goalscorers

3 goals
 Kyle Ebecilio
 Hallam Hope
 Tonny Vilhena
 Samed Yeşil
2 goals
 Viktor Fischer
 Sébastien Haller
1 goal

 Lukáš Juliš
 Nikolas Salašovič
 Nicolai Johannesen
 Christian Nørgaard
 Kenneth Zohore
 Nick Powell

 Brad Smith
 Souahilo Meïté
 Kaan Ayhan
 Nils Quaschner
 Okan Aydın
 Karim Rekik

 Memphis Depay
 Terence Kongolo
 Fabian Himcinschi
 Vojno Ješić
 Nikola Mandić
 Ognjen Ožegović

own goals
 Bojan Nastić (for Denmark)

Golden boot

Tournament select squad

Goalkeepers	
 	1. Boy de Jong
 	16. Lukas Zima
Defenders
 	2. Mads Aaquist
 	6. Nathaniel Chalobah
 	4. Nicolai Johannessen
 	3. Terence Kongolo
 	3. Frederik Holst
 	3. Benjamin Mendy
 	2. Mitchell Weiser
 	5. Jetro Willems

Midfielders
 	8. Yassine Ayoub
 	8. Emre Can
 	6. Kyle Ebecilio
 	4. John Lundstram
 	8. Souahilo Meïté
 	6. Patrick Olsen
Attackers
 	9. Anass Achahbar
 	11. Memphis Depay
 	10. Viktor Fischer
 	10. Tonny Vilhena
 	10. Abdallah Yaisien
 	9. Samed Yeşil

References

External links 
 – uefa.com

 
U
2011
International association football competitions hosted by Serbia
U
May 2011 sports events in Europe
2011 in youth association football